The Friedreich's Ataxia Research Alliance (FARA) is a 501(c)(3), non-profit, tax-exempt organization formed to support the research on Friedreich's ataxia. It was formed in 1998 by Ron and Raychel Bartek. FARA's turnover in 2017 was $7.3 million with over 98% spent on programs. It has had a Four Star rating from Charity Navigator since 2011. Research is also advanced by its partnership with the Muscular Dystrophy Association  FARA organizes various cycling fundraising events One of the biggest events is the RideAtaxia which is a sponsored bicycle ride in various locations akin to Race for the Cure  The organization maintains a large patient registry.

References

Medical research organizations
Health charities in the United States
Organizations established in 1998
1998 establishments in Pennsylvania
Medical and health organizations based in Pennsylvania